Darrell Wayne Brown (born October 29, 1955) is a former professional outfielder. He played during four seasons at the major league level for the Detroit Tigers, Oakland Athletics, and Minnesota Twins of Major League Baseball (MLB). He was drafted by the Tigers in the third round of the 1977 amateur draft. Brown played his first professional season with their Class A-Advanced Lakeland Tigers in 1977, and split his last season with the Triple-A affiliates of the San Francisco Giants (Phoenix Firebirds), Seattle Mariners (Calgary Cannons), and Texas Rangers (Oklahoma RedHawks) in 1986.

External links
, or Retrosheet, or Pura Pelota (Venezuelan Winter League)

1955 births
Living people
African-American baseball players
All-American college baseball players
American expatriate baseball players in Canada
American expatriate baseball players in Mexico
Baseball players from Oklahoma
Birmingham Barons players
Bravos de León players
Cal State Los Angeles Golden Eagles baseball players
Calgary Cannons players
Detroit Tigers players
Evansville Triplets players
Industriales de Monterrey players
Lakeland Tigers players
Major League Baseball outfielders
Minnesota Twins players
Minot Mallards players
Montgomery Rebels players
Nashville Sounds players
Oakland Athletics players
Oklahoma City 89ers players
Phoenix Firebirds players
Rochester Red Wings players
Sonoma County Crushers players
Sportspeople from Oklahoma City
Tacoma Tigers players
Tiburones de La Guaira players
American expatriate baseball players in Venezuela
Toledo Mud Hens players
21st-century African-American people
20th-century African-American sportspeople
Crenshaw High School alumni